The 2010 Wisconsin gubernatorial election took place on November 2, 2010, to elect the Governor and Lieutenant Governor of Wisconsin. The primary elections on September 14 determined which candidates advanced to the general election.

Incumbent Democratic Governor Jim Doyle did not seek re-election in 2010, making for the first open gubernatorial election in Wisconsin since 1982. Republican nominee Scott Walker, the Milwaukee County Executive, defeated Democratic nominee Tom Barrett, the Mayor of Milwaukee.

Democratic primary

Candidates for Governor

Declared
 Tom Barrett, Mayor of Milwaukee and former U.S. Representative
 Tim John

Failed to qualify
 Jared Gary Christiansen
 Dominic Reinwand

Candidates for Lieutenant Governor

Declared
 G. Spencer Coggs, state senator from Milwaukee and former state representative for 20 years.
 Tom Nelson, Democratic Majority Leader in the Wisconsin State Assembly, member since 2005 representing Outagamie County.
 Henry Sanders
 James L. Schneider

Results

Republican primary

Candidates for Governor

Declared
 Mark Neumann, former U.S. Representative and nominee for the U.S. Senate in 1998
 Scott Paterick
 Scott Walker, Milwaukee County Executive

Failed to qualify
 William "Bill" Ingram, truck driver and write-in candidate for President of the United States in 2008
 John Schless

Candidates for Lieutenant Governor

Declared
 Brett Davis, state representative from Oregon, Wisconsin.
 Rebecca Kleefisch, former WISN-TV morning anchor and frequent on-air contributor to Charlie Sykes' radio show on WTMJ (AM).
 Robert Gerald Lorge
 Dave Ross, Mayor of Superior, Wisconsin
 Nick Voegeli

Polling

Results

Others

Candidates

Declared
 James Dean Langer (Independent)
 James James (Common Sense)

Failed to qualify
 Michael J. Blinkwitz
 Terry Virgil

General election

Candidates
Seven candidates appeared on the primary election ballot: two Democrats, three Republicans and two other candidates. The Democratic and Republican nominees will face the independent candidates using the "Independent" and "Common Sense" labels in the November general election.

Predictions

Polling

Results

Results by county

References

External links
 Elections & Voting at the Wisconsin Government Accountability Board
 Candidate list
 Wisconsin Governor Candidates at Project Vote Smart
 Campaign contributions for 2010 Wisconsin Governor from Follow the Money
 2010 Wisconsin Gubernatorial General Election graph of multiple polls from Pollster.com
 Election 2010: Wisconsin Governor from Rasmussen Reports
 2010 Wisconsin Governor – Walker vs. Barrett from Real Clear Politics
 2010 Wisconsin Governor's Race from CQ Politics
 Race Profile in The New York Times
 Election 2010 at the Milwaukee Journal Sentinel
Debates
 Wisconsin Governor Republican Primary Debate, C-SPAN, August 25, 2010
 Wisconsin Gubernatorial Debate, C-SPAN, September 24, 2010
Official campaign websites (Archived)
 Tom Barrett for WI Governor
 Scott Walker for WI Governor
 Tim John for WI Governor

Wisconsin
Gubernatorial
2010